This is a list of Pakistani Australians. It includes Australian citizens and permanent residents of Pakistani ancestry, Pakistani-origin first generation immigrants who were naturalised with Australian citizenship, as well as expatriates who are known to have resided in Australia. The list is sorted alphabetically by the individuals' professions or fields of activity to which they have notably made contributions, such as academia and education, early history, entertainment, politics, religion, science and technology, sports, literature and the arts.

To be included in this list, the person must have a Wikipedia article showing they are Pakistani Australian or must have references showing they are Pakistani Australian and are notable.

Prominent Academia and educationists
Rafat Hussain, specialist on health care
 Sara Ahmed, academic of feminist theory, queer theory, critical race theory and postcolonialism
Sohail Inayatullah, futurologist
 Ahmar Mahboob, linguist
 Samina Yasmeen, specialist on political and strategic development

Early history and exploration 

 Dervish Bejah, Baloch cameleer in South Australia
 Monga Khan, hawker from Mirpur (now Azad Kashmir) who settled in Victoria.
 Muhammad Hassan Musa Khan, Pashtun cameleer from Karachi who came to Australia in 1896 and was appointed as arbitrator in a court case in 1899 involving camel importation
 Dost Mahomet, Baloch cameleer in Western Australia

Entertainment and media
 Adil Memon, indie singer-songwriter, The X Factor season 4 contestant and Australia's Got Talent season 4 semi-finalist (with sister Maimuna Memon)
 Sami Shah, stand-up comedian and writer

Literature and art
 Azhar Abidi, novelist and translator
 Hanifa Deen, author and social commentator
 Mehwish Iqbal, contemporary artist
 Saeed Khan, Urdu poet
 Zohab Zee Khan, performance poet and rapper
 Ashraf Shad, Urdu novelist, poet and journalist
 Irfan Yusuf, author and social commentator

Politics
 Mehreen Faruqi, member of the Australian Senate for Greens from New South Wales, and former MP in the New South Wales Legislative Council

Religion
 Arnold Heredia, Christian priest
 Daniel Scot, Christian missionary

Science and technology
 Shahbaz Khan, hydrologist

Sports
 Fawad Ahmed, cricketer
 Rameez Junaid, tennis player
 Arshad Khan, former Pakistani cricketer now living in Australia
 Usman Khawaja, cricketer
 Usman Qadir, Pakistani cricketer, moved to Australia in 2012
 Clive Rose, Tasmanian cricketer
 Duncan Sharpe, former Pakistani cricketer, moved to Australia and played for South Australia
 Waqar Younis, former Pakistani cricketer, lives in Australia with family
 Ashraf Choudhry, Olympic wrestler from Pakistan; moved to Adelaide in 1972.

See also 

 Lists of Australians
 List of Pakistanis
 Pakistani Australians

References

Pakistani Australian

Pakistani
Lists of Pakistani people
Pakistani